Oraesia emarginata is a species of moth of the family Erebidae first described by Johan Christian Fabricius in 1794. It is found in Australia, New Caledonia, Indonesia, New Guinea, Pakistan, the Philippines, India, Sri Lanka, Sulawesi, Taiwan, China, Japan, Korea and Nepal as well as Eritrea, Ethiopia, Kenya, Namibia, Nigeria, South Africa, Tanzania, the Gambia, Uganda, Oman and Yemen.

Description
The wingspan is about 35–42 mm. Antennae of male unipectinate. Palpi with the third joint produced to a point. Forewings with outer margin angled at vein 4. Male has fiery orange head and collar. Thorax reddish brown. Abdomen fuscous. Forewings reddish brown suffused with purple. Numerous indistinct slightly waved oblique lines present. A dark streak found on median nervure. An oblique double line runs from apex to inner margin beyond middle, filled in with pale near apex. The area beyond it suffused with gold colour. Hindwings ochreous white, suffused with fuscous towards outer margin.

Female has much more variegated forewings. A diffused chocolate patch found below middle of cell. A white streak can be seen on vein 2. Abdomen and hindwings fuscous. Larva dark violet brown with a sub-dorsal series of scarlet and yellow spots and sub-lateral white dot series. They pierce fruit (peach, loquat and citrus) to suck the juice.

The larvae feed on Menispermaceae species, including Stephania japonica as well as Cissampelos and Cocculus species. This species overwinters in the larval stage in clusters of weeds and soil cracks around the host plant. Some other food plants are Citrus, Dimocarpus, Ipomoea, Malus pumila, Merremia quinquefolia, Prunus persica, Psidium guajava, Sida, Stephania discolor, Vitis, and Ardenia gummifera.

Subspecies
Oraesia emarginata emarginata
Oraesia emarginata defreinai Behounek, Hacker & Speidel, 2010 (Ethiopia, Kenya, Namibia, Nigeria, Oman, South Africa, Tanzania and Yemen)

Gallery

References

External links
Morphology, life history and circadian rhythm of the fruit-piercing moth, Oraesia emarginata (Lepidoptera: Noctuidae)
Bionomics, ecology and control methods of fruit-piercing moths, Oraesia emarginata Fabricius and Oraesia excavata Butler
Pherobase Invasive
Mating, feeding and flight behaviors of the Fruit Sucking Moth, Oraesia emarginata

Calpinae
Moths of Africa
Moths of Asia
Moths of Japan
Moths of the Middle East
Moths described in 1794